Robert S. Taubman (born December 27, 1953) is an American businessman. He serves as the current chairman, president and chief executive officer of Taubman Centers.

Early life and education
Taubman was born to a Jewish family, the son of Reva (née Kolodney) and A. Alfred Taubman (1924-2015). His father founded Taubman Centers, headquartered in Bloomfield Hills, Michigan. He received a Bachelor of Science in Economics from Boston University.

Career
He joined his family business, Taubman Centers, in 1976. He became executive vice president in 1984, chief operating officer in 1988, president and chief executive officer in 1990, and chairman in 2001.

Taubman serves on the executive board of the National Association of Real Estate Investment Trusts (NAREIT) and is a member and immediate past chairman of the Real Estate Roundtable in Washington, D.C.  He is a member and past trustee of the Urban Land Institute (ULI) and founding chairman of ULI’s Detroit Regional District Council.  He also is a member and past trustee of the International Council of Shopping Centers (ICSC). Taubman is a member of the board of directors of Comerica Incorporated (NYSE:CMA) and is a past board member of Sotheby’s Holdings, Inc. (NYSE:BID).

Among his many civic and charitable commitments, Taubman serves on the executive committee of Southeastern Michigan Council of Governments (SEMCOG) and is as a member of the board of directors of Business Leaders for Michigan. He is a trustee of the Cranbrook Educational Community, where he is chairman of the audit committee. He serves on the University of Michigan Investment Advisory Committee, and is the advisory board chair of the Taubman Center for State and Local Government and a council member of the Belfer Center for Science and International Affairs, both at the Harvard Kennedy School. Taubman holds a B.S. degree in economics from Boston University.

Personal life
He was married to the late author Julia Reyes (daughter of the founder of Reyes Holdings and sister of Jude Reyes and J. Christopher Reyes) and has four children: Alexander, Ghislaine, Theodore, and Sebastian Taubman.

References

Living people
20th-century American Jews
People from Bloomfield Hills, Michigan
Boston University College of Arts and Sciences alumni
American chief executives
1953 births
21st-century American Jews